The Majestic Theatre is a historic movie theater located at 240–246 Collinsville Ave. in East St. Louis, Illinois. Built in 1928, the theater replaced a 1907 theater which had burned down. The Spanish Gothic theater was designed by the Boller Brothers, who were nationally prominent theater architects. Multicolored tiles decorate the building's front facade, forming patterned mosaics. The front facade also features piers with decorative peaks and tall arched windows. The theater attracted numerous celebrities to its grand opening, and it represented several firsts among East St. Louis cinemas; it was the first in the city with a modern air conditioning system and the first in Southern Illinois to show talkies. The theater closed in the 1960s.

The theater was added to the National Register of Historic Places on May 9, 1985.

References

Theatres on the National Register of Historic Places in Illinois
Theatres completed in 1928
Buildings and structures in St. Clair County, Illinois
East St. Louis, Illinois
National Register of Historic Places in St. Clair County, Illinois
1928 establishments in Illinois